The red neon blue-eye (Pseudomugil luminatus) is a species of fish in the subfamily Pseudomugilinae. It has only been recorded from swamps in the vicinity of Timika in Papua, Indonesia.

References

luminatus
Taxa named by Gerald R. Allen
Taxa named by Peter J. Unmack
Taxa named by Renny Kurnia Hadiaty
Fish described in 2016